He Shuheng (7 May 1876 – 24 February 1935) was a Chinese Communist revolutionary, born in Ningxiang, Hunan province.

Biography

In 1914, He made acquaintance with Mao Zedong while at Hunan Normal University, and the two would eventually become close friends. In April, 1918, He and Mao founded the Xinmin Society. In 1920, the two friends also launched the Russian Study Institute.

In July, 1921, He and Mao traveled to Shanghai to attended the 1st National Congress of the Communist Party of China, as representatives of Changsha. After the congress, He became a member of the CPC's Hunan committee. During the first cooperation between the Kuomintang (KMT) and the CPC, He was a member of the KMT's executive committee and the supervision committee of the KMT's local party in Hunan. In 1927, He went to Shanghai. After the April 12 Incident, He secretly established a print factory for the CPC in Changsha.

In April 1928, He went to Russia to attend the Sixth National Congress of the Communist Party of China. He then entered Moscow Sun Yat-sen University, where his classmates included fellow party members Xu Teli, Wu Yuzhang, Dong Biwu, and Lin Boqu.

In July 1930, He went back to China, and took charge of the National Huji Institute and organized the rescue and transfer to safe places of arrested communists.

In the fall of 1931, He was elected to key posts in the Jiangxi Soviet. Instead of taking part in the Long March, however, He chose to stay behind in the south and engage in guerilla fighting. On February 24, 1935, He was surrounded and killed by Kuomintang troops in Changting, Fujian.

References

1876 births
1935 deaths
Chinese communists
Chinese revolutionaries
Chinese Communist Party politicians from Hunan
Delegates to the 1st National Congress of the Chinese Communist Party
Hunan First Normal University alumni
Moscow Sun Yat-sen University alumni
People from Ningxiang
Politicians from Changsha
Republic of China politicians from Hunan